Wendelin is a male given name and a surname of Germanic origin meaning "wander" or "wanderer". In rare cases the name occurs as a female given name. Notable people with the name include:

People

Given name 
Wendelin of Speyer, German printer from 1468 to 1477
Saint Wendelin of Trier (554-617), hermit and abbot
Wendelin Boeheim (1832–1900), Austrian army officer and weapons historian
Wendelin Enders (1922–2019), German politician
Wendelin Förster (1844–1915), Austrian philologist and Romance scholar
Wendelin Grimm (1818–1890), American farmer
Wendelin Mölzer (born 1980), Austrian politician
Wendelin Moosbrugger (1760–1849), Austrian portrait painter and miniaturist
Wendelin Joseph Nold (1900–1981), American Catholic bishop
Wendelin Rauch (1885–1954), German Roman Catholic clergyman
Wendelin Van Draanen (born 1965), American children's and young-adult fiction writer
Wendelin Weingartner (born 1937), Austrian politician
Wendelin Weißheimer (1838–1910), German classical composer
Wendelin Werner (born 1968), German-born French mathematician
Wendelin Wiedeking (born 1952), German businessman

Surname 
Godefroy Wendelin (1580–1667), Flemish astronomer
Martta Wendelin (1893–1986), Finnish painter
Rudy Wendelin (1910–2000), American artist and creator of Smokey Bear

Characters 
 Wendelin the Weird, a 14th century witch in the Harry Potter franchise

Places 
 Wendelin Grimm Farmstead, United States historic place near Victoria, Minnesota
 Wendelin, Illinois, United States
 Wendelin, Ohio, United States

See also 
 Wend (disambiguation)
 Wende (disambiguation)
 Wendel (disambiguation)
 Wendell (disambiguation)
 Wendeline (disambiguation)
 Wendelinus (disambiguation)
 Wendl, a surname
 Wendling (disambiguation)